Rawa (Rawicz), is a coat of arms of Polish origin. It was borne by several noble families of Polish–Lithuanian Commonwealth, Russian Empire and Ukraine.

The ancestry of first bearers of Rawicz (the Rawici clan) is debated. Version supported by Polish chronicler Jan Długosz points out branch of Czech (Bohemian) Vršovci clan, version supported by Polish heraldist Kasper Niesiecki (as better) says that their origin is pagan Polish.

Lot of families were later legally adopted into the clan or ennobled with this coat of arms, some misattributed to the clan by similarity of arms, names or by simple error or usurpation.

Nowadays it (or its modification) is used as coat of arms of several Polish settlements.

Blazon
Main version (in others colours may differ):

Shield Or (gold) with a bear (probably ursus arctos) Sable (black) facing dexter (right) with a maiden on its back. The maiden, vested in royal attire Gules (red) and a crown Or, with flowing hair and hands upraised a little and expanded, all proper. Out of the crest coronet, between two antlers proper, a bear facing dexter. His left arm in front is lowered, and another one holds a rose on a stem, all proper, which the bear carries to his snout.

History

Power struggles in Bohemia: damnation, prosecution and salvation 

The Vršovci (whose branch was probably the root of some Rawicz bearers) took part in cruel power struggles that occurred in Bohemia on the turn of the first millennium. Together with Přemyslids led by Boleslaus II the Pious they rivalised with Slavniki clan. During the struggles five members of rival Slavniki clan: Soběbor, Spytimír, Pobraslav, Pořej, and Čáslav were murdered. They were brothers of Czech missionary and bishop st. Adalbert of Prague. In 995 he damned the murderers(Vršovci).

In historical records Czech duke Svatopluk of Přemyslids clan is accused of ordering to kill Mutyna and two his sons: Bożej and Boraszek also Unisław and Domisław (all of them belonged to the Vršovci family) during similar power struggles thirteen years later.

Being horrified by those events some of Vršovci fled to Poland, where they were received with honours by king Bolesław III Krzywousty who gave them lands in the duchy of Masovia, that were foundation of future Rawa Voivodeship.

Origin of Polish Rawici 
Rawicz is an old coat of arms, one of the oldest used in Poland. According to the legend it was imported from Lorraine (where it is first mentioned in 1003) prior to 1109. 
According to a legend, the symbol was brought to Lorraine from England, where it was awarded to the descendants of Canute the Great.

The ancestry of first bearers of Rawicz (the Rawici clan) is debated:

 version supported by Polish chronicler Jan Długosz points out one of branches of Czech (Bohemian) Vršovci clan, Early history of Vršovci is described by Cosmas of Prague in "Chronicle of Bohemians".
 version supported by Polish heraldist Kasper Niesiecki (as better) says that their origin is pagan Polish.

Participation in the Battle of Grunwald 
In 1410 Rawicz bearers took part in the Battle of Grunwald. Among 50 Polish gonfalons (regiments) one (the 26th) took the field under Rawa coat of arms and was led by Christian of Ostrów, Kraków castellan. He was also a war councilor, one of the seven chief members of General Headquarters of Władysław II Jagiełło. In addition, one of the Rawicz bearers is marked for his military valour in the Battle of Koronowo that occurred shortly after the Grunwald. This knight's name was Christian of Goworzici, Rawa coat of arms.

(Jan Długosz, Annales seu cronici incliti regni Poloniae)

Legend 
According to the legend, an English king died without leaving a properly perfected testament, so his last will was expressed from the world beyond. He left a crown and all immovable property to his son, and all movables – to his daughter. Being instigated by his councilors, the Prince decided to fulfill his father's will nominally. He ordered to drive a black bear (which undoubtedly was a unit of king's movable property) to a Princess' bedchamber. In case of Princess' death that seemed inevitable, the King's wish would be fulfilled and Princess' failure to manage the movables would be proven. However, the Princess did not only tame the beast but even rode out her chamber on its back, upraising her hands and calling for justice. Her brother made sure that truth and heaven take sister's side. He asked her pardon and married her off to a Duke of Lorraine, with all due property as a portion. As a keepsake Princess gave her descendants a coat of arms with a girl riding a bear depicted on it. This coat of arms was called "Rawicz". It symbolizes ability to overcome difficulties with honour, to change confusion into victory.

This legend is stated in a well-known Polish armorial "Orbis Polonus" assembled by Szymon Okolski in 1641–1643.
<3

Notable bearers
Notable bearers of this coat of arms include:
 Andrzej Gawroński – Polish bishop
 Jan Grot – Polish bishop
 Aleksander Jakub Jasiewicz – grandfather of Lech Kaczyński (President of Poland) and Jarosław Kaczyński (former premier of Poland), father of :pl:Jadwiga Kaczyńska
 Krzysztof Kosiński – Hetman of Ukrainian Cossacks
 Stefan Kossecki-Polish army Officer
 Szymon Okolski
 Antoni Jan Ostrowski – one of commanders of Polish November Uprising
 Kazimierz Ołdakowski – prewar director of Fabryka Broni
 Tomasz Adam Ostrowski
 Władysław Ostrowski – Marshal of the Sejm during November Uprising
 Adam Petrovich Ozharovsky – a Russian general of Polish descent
 Piotr Ożarowski
 Stanisław Przyjemski – Grand Marshal of the Crown
 Julian Ursyn-Niemcewicz
 Jerzy Zdziechowski
 Kazimierz Zdziechowski
 Marian Zdziechowski
  for others see notable people of Rawicz coat of arms on Polish Wikipedia
  articles about notable Russian noble families of cognate coat of arms on Russian Wikipedia
 Dylan Biedrzycki – Master of Mishkeegogamang First Nation and Future Chief (Half Breed)

See also
 Polish heraldry
 Heraldry
 Rawicz (note the bear in the city's coat-of-arms)

External links 
  Rawicz Coat of Arms, altered one, bearers

Sources
   Bartosz Paprocki. Herby rycerstwa polskiego. II ed. Krakow, 1858. pp. 539–550.
  "Herbarz polski Kaspra Niesieckiego S.J." vol. VIII 97–100, Kasper Niesiecki, Jan Nepomucen Bobrowicz, Leipzig 1841
 , partly  Obshchiy Gyerbovnik dvoryanskih rodov Vsyerossiyskoy Impyerii (Общий Гербовник дворянских родов Всероссийской Империи) 1797–1917

Notes

Polish coats of arms